A Tillana or thillana is a rhythmic piece in Carnatic music that is generally performed at the end of a concert and widely used in classical indian dance performances. It was popularised by Dr. M Balamuralikrishna and some other musicians A Tillana uses tala-like phrases in the pallavi and anupallavi, and lyrics in the charanam.

The thillana is based on the tarana which was introduced by Amir Khusrau (1253-1325 CE).

Popular Compositions
 Kadanakuthuhalam Thillana composed by Dr.M. Balamuralikrishna (Ragam: Kadanakuthuhalam)
 Kadanakuthuhalam Thillana composed by Lalgudi Jayaraman (Ragam: Kadanakuthuhalam)
 Kalinga Narthana Thillana composed by Sri Oothukkadu Venkata Ravi (Ragam: Gambhira Natta)
 Mohanakalyani Thillana composed by violinist Lalgudi Jayaraman (Ragam: Mohanakalyani)
 Garudadhwani Thillana composed by Dr.M. Balamuralikrishna (Ragam: Garudadhwani)
 Gita Dhuniku Thillana composed by Maharaja Swathi Thirunal (Ragam: Dhanashree)
 Khamas Thillana composed by Pattanam Sri Subramania Iyer (Ragam: Khamas)
 Khamas Thillana composed by Lalgudi Jayaraman (Ragam: Khamas)
 Jaya Ragamalika Thillana composed by Dr.M. Balamuralikrishna (Ragam: Kalyani)
 Dwijavanthi Thillana composed by Lalgudi Jayaraman (Ragam: Dwijavanthi)
 Brindavani Thillana composed by Dr.M. Balamuralikrishna (Ragam: Brindavani)
 Revathi Thillana composed by Lalgudi Jayaraman (Ragam: Revathi)

References

Carnatic music terminology
Elements of a Bharatanatyam performance